Yarnal is a village in Vijaypur district in the southern state of Karnataka, India.

References

Villages in Belagavi district